The Cross City Correctional Institution is a state prison for men located in Cross City, Dixie County, Florida, owned and operated by the Florida Department of Corrections.  

This facility has a mix of security levels, including minimum, medium, and close, and houses adult male offenders.  Cross City first opened in 1972 on the grounds of the decommissioned Cross City Air Force Station, and has a maximum capacity of 1802 prisoners.

References

Prisons in Florida
Buildings and structures in Dixie County, Florida
1972 establishments in Florida